Lainey is a given name. It means "bright or shining light". Not incredibly popular, however, it gained more popularity in the 1990s.

People with the name
 Lainey Keogh (born 1957), an Irish fashion designer
 Lainey Lipson, an actress featured in MyMusic
 Elaine "Lainey" Lui (born 1973), a Canadian television personality
 Lainey Wilson, American singer

Fictional characters with the name
 Lainey Lewis, a character in  The Goldbergs
 Dr. Louise Elaine "Lainey" Winters, a character in General Hospital

See also
 Lany (disambiguation)
 Laney (disambiguation)
 Lainie

Nicknames